Maila is a predominantly Estonian and Finnish feminine given name.

As of 1 January 2020, 321 women in Estonia have the first name Maila, making it the 396th most popular female name in the country. The name is most commonly found in Valga County. Individuals bearing the name Maia include:

Maila Ankkuri (born 1944), Finnish long track speed skater
Maila Lehtimäki (born 1966), Finnish long track speed skater
Maila Nisula (born 1931), Finnish gymnast 
Maila Nurmi (1922–2008), American actress and television personality 
Maila Rästas (1937–2008), Estonian actress
Maila Talvio (1871–1951), Finnish writer

References

Feminine given names
Estonian feminine given names
Finnish feminine given names